Dawn Dunlap is an American former actress best known for her appearance as Laura in David Hamilton's Laura. She quit the film industry in 1985. She later married British advertising agent Frank Lowe, taking the name "Lady Dawn Lowe". The couple had a son (Sebastian) and divorced in 2007.

Filmography 
 Laura, or Laura, les ombres de l'été (1979) as Laura
 Liar's Moon (1982) as Teaser
 Night Shift (1982) as Maxine
 Forbidden World (1982) as Tracy Baxter
 Heartbreaker (1983) as Kim
 Barbarian Queen (1985) as Taramis

References

Bibliography

About Dawn Dunlap 
- Olivier Mathieu, Le Portrait de Dawn Dunlap, Cluj-Napoca, Casa Cărţii de Ştiinţă, 2017, 69 p. (in French)

External links 

American child actresses
American film actresses
Living people
Actresses from Austin, Texas
Year of birth missing (living people)
21st-century American women